Attalia is the ancient name of Antalya, a city on the Mediterranean coast of southwestern Turkey.

Attalia, Atalia, or similar spellings may also refer to:

Boats
Attalia 32, a French sailboat design

Media
 Athalie, a 1691 play by French playwright Jean Racine based on the biblical story of Athaliah, the queen of Judah
 Athalia (Handel), a 1733 oratorio by George Frideric Handel
 Atalia (Mayr), an 1822 oratorio by Simon Mayr
 Atalia, a 1984 Israeli film
 Attalia (Libya), a defunct Arabic-language weekly newspaper in Tripoli

People 
 Athaliah, a queen of Judah
 Atalia, an ancient Assyrian queen

Places
 Attalea in Lydia
 Athalia, Ohio, US
 Attalia, Washington, US

Science
 Attalia,  a synonym for Galinthias, a genus of praying mantis
 515 Athalia, a minor planet
 Atalia, a synonym for Clubiona, a genus of spiders
 Attalea (plant), a genus of plants

See also
 Adalia (disambiguation), alternate spelling
 Atalya (disambiguation)